The 1966 Iraq Central FA Perseverance Cup was the 5th and final edition of the Iraq Central FA Perseverance Cup. The match was contested between the winners and runners-up of the 1965–66 edition of the Iraq Central FA League, Al-Firqa Al-Thalitha and Al-Quwa Al-Jawiya respectively. Al-Firqa Al-Thalitha won the game 1–0 with a goal by Gorgis Ismail to win the cup for the second time in their history.

During the match, the ball went outside the field and was lost. A worker was sent to fetch a new ball from the Iraq Football Association's storage which led to a mid-game delay of half an hour.

Match

Details

References

External links
 Iraqi Football Website

Football competitions in Iraq
1966 in Iraqi sport
1966 in Asian football